The Battle of Jutland was fought on 31 May and 1 June 1916, in the waters of the North Sea, between forces of the Royal Navy and Imperial German Navy. The battle involved 250 warships, and, in terms of combined tonnage of vessels engaged, was the largest naval battle in history. 

The engagement was the result of the high commands of the two nations' eagerness to give their publics a victory in contrast to the stalemate on the ground in Western Europe (the Battle of Verdun had been underway for three months at the time the opposing fleets sortied). Both navies had plans to lure the other's battlecruisers into a trap where they could be defeated by a superior force of battleships.

In the event, the battle had no impact on the course of the war and victory was claimed by both sides.

Summary

Ships present

 The British capital ships carried a larger weight of broadside— compared to —than the German ones.
 The German Navy's torpedo boats were of similar size and function to the destroyers in the Royal Navy, and are often referred to as such.

Losses

 Number in parentheses indicates date of loss (31st May or 1st June)

Abbreviations

Officers killed in action are indicated thus: 

Abbreviations for officers’ ranks (German ranks translated according to current NATO practice): 
 Adm / Admiral
 VAdm / Vice-admiral : Vizeadmiral / VAdm
 RAdm / Rear-admiral : Konteradmiral / KAdm
 Cdre / Commodore : Kommodore / Kom
 Capt / Captain : Kapitän zur See / KptzS
 Cdr / Commander : Fregattenkapitän / FKpt
 Lt Cdr / Lieutenant-commander : Korvettenkapitän / KKpt
 Lt / Lieutenant : Kapitänleutnant / KptLt
 SLt / Sub-lieutenant : Oberleutnant zur See / OLtzS
Other abbreviations
 Frhr:Freiherr / title in the Prussian nobility equivalent to Baron)
 SMS: Seiner Majestät Schiff / German; translation: His Majesty's Ship)
 the Hon.: The Honourable

Royal Navy

Grand Fleet
Began sortie from Scapa Flow 9.30pm 28 May
The Grand Fleet was the main body of the British Home Fleets in 1916, based at Scapa Flow in the Orkney Islands and Invergordon on the Cromarty Firth in Scotland.
 Commander-in-chief, Grand Fleet: Admiral Sir John Rushworth Jellicoe,  in HMS Iron Duke
 Second in Command, Grand Fleet: Vice-admiral Sir Cecil Burney,  in HMS Marlborough
 Chief of Staff: VAdm Sir Charles Edward Madden, 
 Captain of the Fleet: Cdre Lionel Halsey, C.B., C.M.G., AdC.
 Master of the Fleet: Capt Oliver Elles Leggett
 flag lieutenants: Cdr  the Hon. Matthew Robert Best, M.V.O., Cdr Charles Morton Forbes, Cdr Alexander Raill Wadham, Cdr Richard Lindsay Nicholson

Battleships

 2nd Battle Squadron (battleships)
 Vice-Admiral Thomas Henry Martyn Jerram
 Sortied from Cromarty Firth; rendevoused with Jellicoe's force around noon 31 May
 1st Division: VAdm Jerram
  (flagship): Capt Frederick Field
 : Capt George Henry Baird
 : Capt Michael Culme-Seymour
 : Capt the Hon. Victor Stanley
 2nd Division: RAdm Arthur Leveson
  (flagship): Capt Oliver Backhouse
 : Capt George Borrett
 : Capt Hugh Tothill
 : Capt James Fergusson

 Fleet Flagship (at head of 3rd Division but not part of 4th Battle Squadron)
 : Capt Frederic Charles Dreyer

 4th Battle Squadron (battleships)
 Vice-Admiral Sir Frederick Charles Doveton Sturdee, 1st Baronet
 Flag commander: Cdr William Milbourne James 
 3rd Division: RAdm Sir Alexander Duff
 : Capt Crawford Maclachlan
  (flagship): Capt Edmond Hyde Parker
 : Capt William Nicholson
 4th Division: VAdm Sturdee
  (flagship): Capt Henry Wise Parker
 : Capt Edward Francis Bruen
 : Capt Edwin Veale Underhill
 : Capt James Douglas Dick

 1st Battle Squadron (battleships)
 Admiral Sir Cecil Burney
 Chief of Staff: Cdre Percy Grant
 Flag lieutenant: Lt Cdr James Buller Kitson 
 5th Division: RAdm Ernest Frederick Augustus Gaunt
  (flagship): Capt Dudley Pound
 : Capt James Clement Ley
 : Capt William Wordsworth Fisher
  Capt Vivian Bernard
 6th Division: VAdm Burney
  (flagship): Capt George Parish Ross
 : Capt Edward Buxton Kiddle
 : Capt Lewis Clinton-Baker
 : Capt Henry Montagu Doughty

Cruisers

 1st Cruiser Squadron (armoured cruisers)
 Rear-Admiral Sir Robert Keith Arbuthnot, 4th Baronet 
   (flagship): Capt Stanley Venn Ellis 
  : Capt Vincent Barkly Molteno
 : Capt Henry Blackett
  : Capt Thomas Parry Bonham

 2nd Cruiser Squadron (armoured cruisers)
 Rear-Admiral Herbert Leopold Heath
  (flagship): Capt Arthur Cloudesley Shovel Hughes D'Aeth 
 : Capt Herbert John Savill
 : Capt John Saumarez Dumaresq
 : Capt Eustace La Trobe Leatham

 4th Light Cruiser Squadron
 Commodore Charles Edward Le Mesurier
 : Cdre Le Mesurier
 : Capt Cyril Samuel Townsend
 : Capt Alan Geoffrey Hotham
 : Capt Henry Ralph Crooke
 : Capt the Hon. Herbert Meade

 Light cruisers attached for repeating visual signals
 : Capt Louis Charles Stirling Woollcombe (attached to 2nd B.S.)
 : Capt Percy Withers (attached to Fleet Flagship)
 : Capt John Moore Casement (attached to 4th B.S.)
 : Capt Arthur Brandreth Scott Dutton (attached to 1st B.S.)

 Other ships under direct command of the Commander-in-Chief
 : Cdr Berwick Curtis (destroyer-minelayer)
 : Lt Cdr Douglas Faviell (destroyer)

Destroyers

 4th Destroyer Flotilla
 Captain Charles John Wintour  
    (flotilla leader): Capt Wintour 
 First half-flotilla / 4th D.F. 
 : Lt Cdr Clarence Walter Eyre Trelawney 
  : Lt Cdr Sydney Hopkins 
 : Lt Cdr Reginald Stannus Goff 
 : Lt Cdr Ernald Gilbert Hoskins Master 
 Group 8 / 4th D.F. 
 : Cdr Robert Gerald Hamond 
 : Cdr Richard Anthony Aston Plowden 
 : Lt Cdr the Hon. Cyril Augustus Ward (from 12th D.F.) 
 : Lt Cdr James Robert Carnegie Cavendish 
 Second half-flotilla / 4th D.F.
  (flotilla leader): Cdr Walter Lingen Allen 
 3rd Division / 4th D.F. 
 : Cdr Hugh Davenport Colville 
 : Lt Cdr Arthur Macaulay Lecky 
 4th Division / 4th D.F. 
 : Cdr Reginald Becher Caldwell Hutchinson, D.S.C. 
 : Lt Cdr Gordon Alston Coles 
  : Lt Cdr Arthur Marsden 
  : Lt Cdr Frank Goodrich Terry 

 11th Destroyer Flotilla 
 Commodore Hawksley 
  (light cruiser)
 First half-flotilla / 11th D.F. 
 1st Division / 11th D.F. 
 : Cdr Harold Victor Dundas 
 : Lt Cdr Julian Harrison 
 : Lt Cdr Gerald Charles Wynter 
 : Lt Cdr Henry Clive Rawlings 
 2nd Division /  11th D.F. 
 : Cdr Claud Finlinson Allsup 
 : Lt Cdr Robert Makin 
 : Lt Cdr Edward McConnell Wyndham Lawrie 
 : Lt Cdr Claude Lindsay Bate 
 Second half-flotilla/11th D.F. 
  (flotilla leader): Cdr Harold Ernest Sulivan 
 3rd Division / 11th D.F. 
 : Lt Cdr George Bibby Hartford 
 : Lt Charles Granville Naylor 
 : Lt Cdr Gerald Cartmell Harrison 
 4th Division / 11th D.F. 
 : Cdr (Acting) William Dion Irvin 
 : Lt Cdr Ralph Vincent Eyre 
 : Lt Cdr Hugh Undecimus Fletcher 

 12th Destroyer Flotilla
 Captain Anselan John Buchanan Stirling
  (flotilla leader): Capt Stirling 
 First half-flotilla / 12th D.F. 
 1st Division / 12th D.F. 
 : Cdr George William McOran Campbell 
 : Lt Cdr John Jackson Cuthbert Ridley 
 : Lt Cdr Reginald Watkins Grubb 
 : Lt Cdr Arthur Gerald Onslow   
 2nd Division / 12th D.F. 
 : Cdr John Pelham Champion 
 : Lt Cdr Henry Victor Hudson 
 : Lt Cdr Eric Quentin Carter 
 : Lt Cdr Henry Percy Boxer 
 Second half-flotilla / 12th D.F.: Cdr Norton Allen Sulivan 
  (flotilla leader): Cdr Norton Allen Sulivan 
 : Cdr Charles Geoffrey Coleridge Sumner 
 : Lt Cdr Herbert Inglis Nigel Lyon 
 : Lt Cdr Charles Astley Poignand 
 : Lt Cdr Spencer Francis Russell 
 : Lt Cdr Edwin Anderson Homan

3rd Battle Cruiser Squadron 

This squadron, temporarily attached to the Grand Fleet from the Battle Cruiser Fleet, was stationed ahead of the main body, with the intention that it join Beatty when the action began. 
Rear-Admiral The Hon. Horace Lambert Alexander Hood  
 Battlecruisers
   (flagship): Capt Arthur Lindesay Cay 
 : Capt Edward Henry Fitzhardinge Heaton-Ellis
 : Capt Francis William Kennedy
 Accompanying cruisers
  : Capt Percy Molyneux Rawson Royds
  : Capt Robert Neale Lawson
 Attached destroyers 
  : Cdr Loftus William Jones 
 : Cdr Lewis Gonne Eyre Crabbe (Admiralty M class)
 : Lt Cdr Fairfax Moresby Kerr
 : Lt Cdr John Ouchterlony Barron

Battle Cruiser Fleet

This force of high-speed ships was subordinate to the Commander in Chief of the Grand Fleet, but operated independently as an advanced guard, intended to reconnoiter aggressively the enemy fleet and to engage enemy scouting forces. At its core were six battlecruisers, accompanied by 13 light cruisers, and escorted by 18 destroyers and an early aircraft carrier.

Sortied from Firth of Forth soon after 6.00pm 30 May
Vice-Admiral Sir David Richard Beatty in HMS Lion
 Chief of Staff: Capt Rudolf Walter Bentinck
 Flag lieutenants: Cdr the Hon. Reginald Aylmer Ranfurly Plunkett, Lt Cdr Ralph Frederick Seymour

Battlecruisers

 : (flagship) Capt Alfred Chatfield
 1st Battlecruiser Squadron: RAdm Osmond Brock,
  (flagship): Capt Walter Henry Cowan, 
  : Capt Cecil Irby Prowse 
 : Capt Henry Bertram Pelly.
 2nd Battlecruiser Squadron: RAdm. William Pakenham,.
  (flagship): Capt John Green
  : Capt Charles Fitzgerald Sowerby

Light cruisers
 1st Light Cruiser Squadron: Cdre Edwyn Alexander-Sinclair
  Cdre Alexander-Sinclair
 : Capt John Cameron
 : Capt Bertram Thesiger
 : Capt Tufton Beamish
 2nd Light Cruiser Squadron: Cdre William Goodenough
 : Cdre Goodenough
 : Capt Arthur Duff
 : Capt Charles Blois Miller
 : Capt Albert Charles Scott
 3rd Light Cruiser Squadron: RAdm Trevylyan Napier
  (flagship): Capt John Douglas Edwards
 : Capt Thomas Drummond Pratt
 : Capt Edward Reeves
 : Capt William Frederick Blunt

Attached vessel
 seaplane tender : Lt Cdr Charles Gwillim Robinson
 aircraft: 2 Short Type 184 reconnaissance seaplanes, 2 Sopwith Baby fighter seaplanes

Destroyers

13th Destroyer Flotilla
Captain James Uchtred Farie
  (light cruiser): Capt  Farie
 1st Division / 13th D.F.
 : Lt Cdr Cecil Henry Hulton Sams
 : Lt Cdr Montague George Bentinck Legge
 : Lt Cdr Cuthbert Patrick Blake  (attached from 10th D.F., Harwich Force)
 : Lt Cdr Roger Vincent Alison  (detached to escort HMS Engadine)
 2nd Division / 13th D.F.
  : Cdr the Hon. Edward Bingham
  : Lt Cdr Paul Whitfield
 : Lt Jack Ernest Albert Mocatta
 : Lt Cdr John Tovey  (detached to escort HMS Engadine)
 3rd Division / 13th D.F.
 : Lt Cdr Geoffrey Corlett
 : Lt Cdr Kenneth Adair Beattie
 : Lt Cdr Evelyn Thomson
  : Lt Cdr Dudley Stuart

 Attached Harwich Destroyers (9th Destroyer Flotilla): Cdr Malcolm Lennon Goldsmith
 1st division / 9th D.F.
 : Cdr Goldsmith
 : Lt Cdr Philip Wilfred Sidney King
 : Lt Cdr Francis Edward Henry Graham Hobart
 2nd division / 9th D.F.
 : Cdr John Coombe Hodgson  (from 10th D.F.)
 : Lt Henry Dawson Crawford Stanistreet
 : Lt Cdr Edward Sidney Graham (from 10th D.F.)

5th Battle Squadron

The 5th Battle Squadron was a special unit of fast s, intended to act as the vanguard of the main battle line. At the Battle of Jutland, it operated with the Battlecruiser Fleet, and was escorted by the 1st Destroyer Flotilla. 
Rear-Admiral Hugh Evan-Thomas
Sortied from Firth of Forth with Battle Cruiser Fleet soon after 6.00pm 30 May
 Battleships
  (flagship): Capt Arthur William Craig
 : Capt Maurice Woollcombe
 : Capt Edward Montgomery Phillpotts
 : Capt the Hon. Algernon Boyle

 1st Destroyer Flotilla  
  (light cruiser): Capt Charles Donnison Roper
 : Lt Cdr Laurence Reynolds Palmer
 1st Division / 1st D.F.
 : Cdr Charles Ramsey
 : Lt Cdr Arthur Grendon Tippet
 : Lt Cdr Charles Herbert Neill James
 : Lt Francis George Glossop
 2nd Division / 1st D.F.
 : Cdr Charles Albert Fremantle
 : Lt Cdr Edward Brooke
 : Cdr Dashwood Fowler Moir
 : Lt Cdr Alexander Hugh Gye

Imperial German Navy

High Seas Fleet (Hochseeflotte)
The High Seas Fleet was the main body of the German surface navy, principally based at Wilhelmshaven, on the Jade River in North-West Germany.
 Commander-in-Chief (Chef der Hochseeflotte): Vizeadmiral Reinhard Scheer in SMS Friedrich der Grosse
 Chief of Staff: KptzS Adolf von Trotha
 Chief of Operations: KptzS

Battleships
 3rd Battle Squadron (III. Geschwader) (battleships)
 Konteradmrial Paul Behncke
 Flag lieutenant: Korvettenkapitän Frhr Ernst von Gagern

 5th Division: KAdm Behncke
  (flagship): KptzS Friedrich Brüninghaus
 : KptzS Ernst Goette
 : KptzS Constanz Feldt
 : KptzS Karl Seiferling

 6th Division: KAdm Hermann Nordmann
  (flagship): KptzS 
 : KptzS Karl Heuser
 : KptzS Karl Sievers

 Fleet Flagship (Flaggschiff der Hochseeflotte)
 : KptzS Theodor Fuchs

 1st Battle Squadron (I. Geschwader) (battleships)
 Vizeadmiral Ehrhard Schmidt
 Flag lieutenant: Korvettenkapitän Wolfgang Wegener

 1st Division: VAdm Schmidt
  (flagship): KptzS Ernst-Oldwig von Natzmer
 : KptzS Hans Küsel
 : KptzS Friedrich von Kameke
 : KptzS Wilhelm Höpfner

 2nd Division: KAdm Walter Engelhardt
  (flagship): KptzS Richard Lange
 : KptzS Heinrich Rohardt
 : KptzS Robert Kühne
 : KptzS Johannes Redlich

 2nd Battle Squadron (II. Geschwader) (battleships)
 Konteradmrial 
 Flag lieutenant: Korvettenkapitän Willy Kahlert

 3rd Division: KAdm Mauve
  (flagship): KptzS Hugo Meurer
 : KptzS Rudolf Bartels
  : KptzS Siegfried Bölken

 4th Division: KAdm Frhr Gottfried von Dalwigk zu Lichtenfels
  (flagship): KptzS Wilhlem Heine
 : KptzS Friedrich Behncke
 : KptzS Eduard Varrentrapp

Light cruisers
 4th Scouting Group (IV. Aufklärungsgruppe) (light cruisers)
 Kommodore Ludwig von Reuter
 Flag lieutenant: Korvettenkapitän Heinrich Weber
  (flagship): FKpt Friedrich Rebensburg
 : KKpt Oscar Böcker
  : FKpt Georg Hoffman 
 : FKpt Max Hagedorn
 : KKpt Gerhard von Gaudecker

Torpedo boats
German  Große Torpedoboote ("large torpedoboats") were the equivalent of British destroyers . 
 First Leader of Torpedo-Boats
 Kommodore Andreas Michelsen
   (light cruiser; flagship 1st Leader of Torpedo-Boats): FKpt Otto Feldmann 

 1st Torpedo-Boat Flotilla (I. Torpedoboots-Flottille) 
 1st Half-Flotilla (1. Halbflottille): KptLt Conrad Albrecht
  (lead boat, half-flotilla): OLtzS Franz-Ferdinand von Loefen
 : KptLt Richard Beitzen
 : KptLt Hermann Metger
 : KptLt Hermann Froelich

 3rd Torpedo-Boat Flotilla (III. Torpedoboots-Flottille)
 Korvettenkapitän Wilhelm Hollmann
  (lead boat, flotilla): KptLt Friedrich Götting
 5th Half-Flotilla (5. Halbflottille) : KptLt Theophil Gautier 
  (lead boat, half-flotilla): OLtzS Friedrich Ulrich
 : KptLt Martin Delbrück
 : KptLt Hans Scabell
 6th Half-Flotilla (6. Halbflottille): Korvettenkapitän Theodor Riedel 
  (lead boat, half-flotilla) : KptLt Friedrich Eckoldt 
 : KptLt Otto Karlowa
 : KptLt Bernd von Arnim

 5th Torpedo-Boat Flotilla (V. Torpedoboots-Flottille)
 Korvettenkapitän Oskar Heinecke
  (lead boat, flotilla): KptLt Adolf Müller

 9th Half-Flotilla (9. Halbflottille): KptLt Gerhard Hoefer
  (lead boat, half-flotilla): KptLt Gerhard Hoefer
  : KptLt Armin Barop
 : OLtzS Hans Behrendt
 : OLtzS Hans Röthig
 : KptLt Manfred von Killinger
 10th Half-Flotilla (10. Halbflottille): KptLt Friedrich Klein
  (lead boat, half-flotilla): OLtzS Ernst Rodenberg
 : OLtzS Paul Tils
 : KptLt Johannes Weinecke
 : KptLt Hans Anschütz
 : OLtzS Waldemar Haumann

 7th Torpedo-Boat Flotilla (VII. Torpedoboots-Flottille)
 Korvettenkapitän Gottlieb von Koch
  (lead boat, flotilla): KptLt Max Fink
 13th Half-Flotilla (13. Halbflottille): KptLt Georg von Zitzewitz
  (lead boat, half-flotilla): OLtzS Christian Schmidt
 : KptLt Hans-Joachim von Puttkammer
 : KptLt Albert Benecke
 : KptLt Walter Loeffler
 : KptLt Bruno Haushalter
 14th Half-Flotilla (14. Halbflottille): Korvettenkapitän Hermann Cordes
  (lead boat, half-flotilla): OLtzS Georg Reimer
 : KptLt Arthur von Killinger
 : OLtzS Wilhelm Keil

Scouting Force

 Commander, Scouting Forces (Befehlshaber die Aufklärungsstreitkräfte): Vizeadmiral Franz Hipper
 Flag lieutenant: Korvettenkapitän Erich Raeder

Battlecruisers
 1st Scouting Group (I. Aufklärungsgruppe)
 Vizeadmiral Hipper
  (flagship) : KptzS Victor Harder
 : KptzS Johannes Hartog
 : KptzS Moritz von Egidy
 : KptzS Johannes von Karpf
 : KptzS Hans Zenker

Light cruisers
 2nd Scouting Group (II. Aufklärungsgruppe)  
 Konteradmiral Friedrich Boedicker
  (flagship): KptzS Thilo von Trotha
  : KFpt Rudolf Madlung
 : KFpt 
  : KFpt Fritz Reiß

Torpedo boats
 Second Leader of Torpedo-Boats
 Kommodore Paul Heinrich
  (light cruiser; flagship Second Leader of Torpedo-Boats): KFpt Bruno Heuberer

 2nd Torpedo-Boat Flotilla (II. Torpedoboots-Flottille)
 Commander Heinrich Schuur
  (lead boat, flotilla): KptLt Theodor Hengstenberg

 3rd Half-Flotilla (3. Halbflottille): KKpt Heinrich Boest
  (lead boat, half-flotilla): KptLt Rudolf Schulte
 : KptLt von Barendorff
 : KptLt 
 : KptLt Leo Riedel

 4th Half-Flotilla (4. Halbflottille): KKpt Adolf Dithmar
  (lead boat, half-flotilla): KptLt Victor Hahndorff
 : KptLt August Vollheim
 : KptLt Heinrich Schickhardt
 : KptLt Fritz Spiess
 : KptLt Georg von Bartenwerffer

 6th Torpedo-Boat Flotilla (VI. Torpedoboots-Flottille)
 Lieut. Commander Max Schultz
  (lead boat, flotilla): KptLt Hermann Boehm

 11th Half-Flotilla (11. Halbflottille) : KptLt Wilhelm Rüman 
  (lead boat, half-flotilla): KptLt Karl von Holleuffer
 : KptLt Siegfried Karstens
 : KptLt Kurt Grimm

 12th Half-Flotilla (12. Halbflottille): KptLt Rudolf Lahs
  (lead boat, half-flotilla): KptLt Robert Stecher
 : KptLt Martin Laßmann
 : KptLt Bruno Krumhaar
 : KptLt Philipp Recke
 : KptLt Wolf von Trotha

 9th Torpedo-Boat Flotilla (IX. Torpedoboots-Flottille)
 Lieut. Commander Herbert Goehle
  (lead boat, flotilla): KptLt Otto Lenssen

 17th Half-Flotilla (17. Halbflottille): KptLt Hermann Ehrhardt
   (lead boat, half-flotilla): OLtzS Hartmut Buddecke
 : KptLt Hans Köhler
 : KptLt Franz Fischer
 : KptLt Werner Dette
 : KptLt Wilhelm Ehrentraut

 18th Half-Flotilla (17. Halbflottille): Korvettenkapitän 
  (lead boat, half-flotilla): OLtzS' Ernst Wolf
 : KptLt Otto Andersen
 : KptLt Waldemar von Münch
  : KptLt Erich Steinbrinck 
  : KptLt Friedrich Ihn

Submarines

 Leader of Submarines (Führer der Unterseeboote) : KptzS Hermann Bauer in SMS Hamburg
 The following submarines were deployed to attack the Grand Fleet in the North Sea during the period of the Battle of Jutland
 Off Terschelling: 
 : KptLt Leo Hillebrand
 : KptLt Hans Nieland
 Off the Humber Estuary: 
 : KptLt Ernst Hashagen
 Off Flamborough Head, Yorkshire: 
 : OLtzS Bernhard Putzier
 Off the Firth of Forth, Scotland:
 : KptLt Hans Walter
 : KptLt Rudolf Schneider
 : KptLt Otto Wünsche
 : KptLt Fahr Edgar von Spiegel von und zu Peckelsheim
 : KptLt Walter Rumpfel
 : KptLt Otto Schultze
 : KptLt Thorwald von Bothmer
 Off Peterhead, Scotland: 
 : KptLt Heinrich Metzger
 Off the Pentland Firth (between the Orkneys and the Scottish mainland): 
 : KptLt Paul Wagenführ
 : KptLt Helmuth Jürst

Airships

During the battle the Germans used the Zeppelin airships of the Naval Airship Section (Marine Luftschiff Abteilung) for scouting, although in the prevailing overcast conditions they were not particularly successful.
The commander of the Naval Airship Section was Korvettenkapitän Peter Strasser, and they flew from bases at Nordholz and Hage in north-west Germany and Tondern (then part of Schleswig; the town became part of Denmark in 1920).

Sortied on 31 May
 L.9: KptzS August Stelling (Army Officer, on the inactive list)
 L.14: KptLt Alois Böcker
 L.16: KptLt Erich Sommerfeldt
 L.21: KptLt Max Dietrich
 L.23: KptLt Otto von Schubert
Sortied on 1 June
 L.11: KptLt Victor Schultze
 L.17: KptLt Herbert Ehrlich
 L.22: KptLt Martin Dietrich
 L.24: KptLt Robert Koch
Did not sortie during the Battle of Jutland
 L.13: KptLt Eduard Prölß
 L.30: OLtzS Horst Treusch von Buttlar-Brandenfels

Notes

References

Sources

Print

Web

External links

 
 
 

Jutland
Battle of Jutland